Mark Meyers may refer to:

 Mark Meyers (tennis) (born 1953), American tennis player
 Mark Meyers, former member of Belgian rock band Deus

See also
Mark Myers